Dahaneh-ye Chah (also Romanized as Dahaneh-ye Chāh and Dahaneh Chāh; also known as Kalāteh-ye Dahaneh-ye Chāh and Kalāteh Daheneh Chāh) is a village in Momenabad Rural District, in the Central District of Sarbisheh County, South Khorasan Province, Iran. At the 2006 census, its population was 101, in 33 families.

References 

Populated places in Sarbisheh County